Felix Ruvolo (1912 - October 10, 1992) was an American painter. He was born in New York City and grew up in Sicily, Italy, where he was raised by his grandparents. He returned to the United States, where he studied at the Art Institute of Chicago. He became a professional painter and began exhibiting his artwork, first in Chicago and later in California. His artwork can be seen at the Museo ItaloAmericano in San Francisco, the Illinois State Museum, and the Art Institute of Chicago.

References

1912 births
1992 deaths
American people of Italian descent
Painters from New York City
Artists from Chicago
School of the Art Institute of Chicago alumni
American male painters
20th-century American painters
American expatriates in Italy
20th-century American male artists